The 1996 Five Nations Championship was the sixty-seventh series of the rugby union Five Nations Championship, and the first in the sport's professional era, which officially began in August 1995. Including the previous incarnations as the Home Nations and Five Nations, this was the hundred-and-second series of the northern hemisphere rugby union championship. Ten matches were played over five weekends from 20 January to 16 March. England were the winners, losing only the first game with France, thus missing the Grand Slam, but winning the Triple Crown. France went into the final week needing a victory to clinch the championship themselves thanks to superior points difference, but lost by a single point to Wales, who not only avoided a whitewash but climbed above Ireland on points difference in doing so.

Participants
The teams involved were:

Squads

Standings

Results

External links
1996 Five Nations Championship at ESPN

1996 rugby union tournaments for national teams
1996
1995–96 in European rugby union
1995–96 in Irish rugby union
1995–96 in English rugby union
1995–96 in Welsh rugby union
1995–96 in Scottish rugby union
1995–96 in French rugby union
Five Nations
Five Nations
Five Nations